The silver-washed fritillary (Argynnis paphia) is a common and variable butterfly found over much of the Palearctic realm – Algeria, Europe, temperate Asia, and Japan.

Description
The silver-washed fritillary butterfly is deep orange with black spots on the upperside of its wings, and has a wingspan of 54–70 mm, with the male being smaller and paler than the female. The underside is green, and, unlike other fritillaries, has silver streaks instead of silver spots, hence the name silver-washed. The caterpillar is black brown with two yellow lines along its back and long reddish-brown spines.

The male possesses scent scales on the upperside of the forewing that run along veins one to four. The scent produced from these scales attracts females and helps to distinguish it from other species.

Food resources
Adults feed on the nectar of bramble, thistles, and knapweeds, and also on aphid honeydew. The silver-washed is a strong flier, and more mobile than other fritillaries, and, as such, can be seen gliding above the tree canopy at high speed. Its preferred habitat is thin, sunny, deciduous woodland, especially oaks, but it has been known to live in coniferous woodland.

The main larval food plant of the species is the common dog violet (Viola riviniana).

Life cycle
Unusually for a butterfly, the female does not lay her eggs on the leaves or stem of the caterpillar's food source (in this case violets), but instead one or two meters above the woodland floor in the crevices of tree bark close to clumps of violets.

When the egg hatches in August, the caterpillar immediately goes into hibernation until spring. Upon awakening, it will drop to the ground, and feeds on violets close to the base of the tree. The caterpillar usually feeds at night, and usually conceals itself during the day away from its food source, but during cool weather will bask in the sunny spots on the forest floor on dry, dead leaves. It will 
pupate amongst the ground vegetation, and the adults will emerge in June.

Subspecies
Argynnis paphia butleri Krulikovsky, 1909 northern Europe, central Europe
Argynnis paphia thalassata Fruhstorfer, 1909 southern Europe
Argynnis paphia dives (Oberthür, 1908) Algeria
Argynnis paphia argyrorrhytes Seitz, [1909] North Caucasus
Argynnis paphia delila Röber, 1896 Turkey
Argynnis paphia masandarensis Gross & Ebert, 1975 Iran
Argynnis paphia pusilla Wnukowsky, 1927 north-west Siberia
Argynnis paphia neopaphia Fruhstorfer, 1907 Amur
Argynnis paphia virescens Nakahara, 1926 Kuriles
Argynnis paphia geisha Hemming, 1934 Japan
Argynnis paphia tsushimana Fruhstorfer, 1906 Japan
Argynnis paphia megalegoria Fruhstorfer, 1907 Szechuan, Yunnan
Argynnis paphia argyrophontes Oberthür, 1923 south-west China
Argynnis paphia formosicola Matsumura

Conservation
The silver-washed fritillary was in decline in the UK for much of the 1970s and 1980s, but seems to be coming back to many of its old territories.

References
Source
 Tom Tolman and Richard Lewington, 2009  Collins Butterfly Guide:The Most Complete Field Guide to the Butterflies of Britain and Europe HarperCollins.  .
 Crory, Andrew. 2016. Fritillary Butterflies.  The Irish Hare. Ulster Wildlife Membership Magazine.  Issue 113 p. 4 
Notes

Argynnis
Butterflies of Africa
Butterflies of Asia
Butterflies of Europe
Butterflies of Japan
Butterflies described in 1758
Taxa named by Carl Linnaeus